Atractogaster is a genus of parasitoid wasps belonging to the family Ichneumonidae.

The species of this genus are found in Europe.

Species:
 Atractogaster semisculptus Kriechbaumer, 1872

References

Ichneumonidae
Hymenoptera genera